Patela is a 1999 Indian Kannada action comedy film directed by Victory Vasu. The  film stars Jaggesh, Payal Malhotra, Lokesh and Jayanthi in the lead roles while Avinash and Killer Venkatesh played the antagonists. The  film has musical score by Hamsalekha.

The film is an adaptation of the 1992 Tamil film  K. Bhagyaraj starrer Raasukutti. Raasukutti was earlier remade in Hindi with Govinda, as Raja Babu. Jaggesh played the role of a naive man who faces trouble in his love life due to him being illiterate.

Cast 
 Jaggesh 
 Payal Malhotra
 Lokesh
 Jayanthi 
 Tennis Krishna
 Avinash
 Killer Venkatesh 
Prasanna 
Apoorva 
Mandeep Rai 
Mohan Kumar 
K. D. Venkatesh 
Stunt Siddu 
 Bank Janardhan
 Satyajith
 Honnavalli Krishna
 Sarigama Viji

Soundtrack

See also 
 Alli Ramachari Illi Brahmachari
 Jagath Kiladi

References 

1999 films
Indian comedy films
Kannada remakes of Tamil films
1990s Kannada-language films
Films scored by Hamsalekha
1999 comedy films